The Centerville Pie Company is a pie company located in Centerville, Massachusetts. It gained fame when it was mentioned on Oprah Winfrey's Favorite Things episode in 2010. Centerville pies were at one time sold through the Harry & David corporation, and are currently available via Goldbelly.

Overview
The company was founded by long-time friends and current owners Laurie Bowen and Kristin Broadley in March, 2009. It is located in the village along a shopping plaza alongside Route 28. In 2009, as Oprah Winfrey and friend Gayle King was attending the funeral of Eunice Kennedy Shriver, then Kristin Broadley delivered to them a chicken pie and a peach pie as a gift. Immediately, the two women became fans of the pies and Gayle went and bought two for her children, Kirby and Will.

On September 19, 2010, Kristin and Laurie appeared on The Oprah Winfrey Show. In December, Oprah named them one of her Ultimate Favorite Things. Although the Centerville Pie Shop Restaurant closed in 2018, the pies are currently available at their Pie Shop in Centerville, MA, on their website and via Goldbelly.

See also

References

Further reading
 The Ultimate Pie Partnership - Oprah.com
 Local shop benefits from the Oprah effect
 Oregon companies discovering what the Oprah bump is all about | OregonLive.com
 Cape pie ladies in Tinseltown | CapeCodOnline.com
 The Barnstable Patriot - DALEY: A happy start to the new year

External links
 Official website
 Audio recording of Gayle King talking about discovering the pie company

Buildings and structures in Barnstable, Massachusetts
Companies based in Barnstable, Massachusetts
Restaurants in Massachusetts
Mail-order retailers
American companies established in 2009
Restaurants established in 2009
2009 establishments in Massachusetts